Robert Ted Harhai (born January 23, 1955) is a former Democratic member of the Pennsylvania House of Representatives. He was first elected on February 3, 1998.

References

External links
Pennsylvania House of Representatives - Ted Harhai (Democrat) official PA House website
Pennsylvania House Democratic Caucus - Ted Harhai official Party website

Living people
Democratic Party members of the Pennsylvania House of Representatives
1955 births
21st-century American politicians